Segangan (Tarifit: Azɣenɣan, ⴰⵣⵖⴻⵏⵖⴰⵏ; Arabic: أزغنغان) is a town and municipality in the province of Nador, Oriental, Morocco. It is one of the major towns of the province. According to the 2004 census, its population was 20,181.

History
Azɣenɣan is a Berber word meaning "stronghold". Segangan is one of the earliest settlements known in the eastern region of Rif. Segangan played a big role in all of the Spanish invasion wars in the region starting from the first Rif War (1893). The second Rif War (1909) actually started from Segangan under the leadership of a local figure Cherif Mohamed Amezyan.
The town also witnessed and played part in the last Rif War (1920) and was part of the Rif Republic till the collapse of the latter in 1926.

References

Populated places in Nador Province